

590001–590100 

|-bgcolor=#f2f2f2
| colspan=4 align=center | 
|}

590101–590200 

|-bgcolor=#f2f2f2
| colspan=4 align=center | 
|}

590201–590300 

|-bgcolor=#f2f2f2
| colspan=4 align=center | 
|}

590301–590400 

|-bgcolor=#f2f2f2
| colspan=4 align=center | 
|}

590401–590500 

|-bgcolor=#f2f2f2
| colspan=4 align=center | 
|}

590501–590600 

|-bgcolor=#f2f2f2
| colspan=4 align=center | 
|}

590601–590700 

|-bgcolor=#f2f2f2
| colspan=4 align=center | 
|}

590701–590800 

|-bgcolor=#f2f2f2
| colspan=4 align=center | 
|}

590801–590900 

|-id=888
| 590888 Chengda ||  || National Cheng Kung University (NCKU), also known as "ChengDa" is one of the top public universities of Taiwan. Established in 1931, the university's motte is "Pursuit of truth through exhaustive reasoning". || 
|}

590901–591000 

|-bgcolor=#f2f2f2
| colspan=4 align=center | 
|}

References 

590001-591000